"That's Another Song" is a song recorded by American country music artist Bryan White. It was released in October 1996 as the third single from the album Between Now and Forever.  The song reached number 15 on the U.S. Billboard Hot Country Singles & Tracks chart and peaked at number 10 on the RPM Country Tracks chart in Canada. It was written by Jule Medders, Monty Powell, John Paul Daniel, and Doug Pincock.

Music video
The music video was directed by Jeffrey C. Phillips and premiered in late 1996.

Chart performance
"That's Another Song" debuted at number 60 on the U.S. Billboard Hot Country Singles & Tracks chart for the week of October 19, 1996

References

1996 singles
1996 songs
Bryan White songs
Song recordings produced by Kyle Lehning
Asylum Records singles
Songs written by Monty Powell
Song recordings produced by Billy Joe Walker Jr.